Georges Jean-Jacques Smarck Michel or Smarck Michel (March 29, 1937 – September 1, 2012) was appointed prime minister of Haiti on October 27, 1994, occupying the post from November 8, 1994 to October 16, 1995. Smarck was President Aristide's third prime minister, and the first to be named after the President's return from exile.

Personal
Michel was born in St. Marc to a military family and completed his post secondary studies (business administration) in the United States.

Prior to politics Michel was a businessman running a grocery store and ran his family bakery.

Political career

His political career began as Minister of Commerce and ended after his Prime Ministership.

Married to wife Victoire Marie-Rose Sterlin, with whom he had a son Kenneth and daughters Patricia and Marjorie Michel. Michel died near Port-au-Prince from brain tumour at age 75.

References

1937 births
2012 deaths
Prime Ministers of Haiti
Deaths from brain tumor
Deaths from cancer in Haiti
20th-century Haitian businesspeople